Table Tennis is an event at the Island Games, the biennial multi-sports event for island nations, territories and dependencies.

Table Tennis was first included in the Island Games in 1987. Table Tennis is not always chosen as a sport in the games.

 Men's and Women's Singles - a maximum of 4 competitors per Member Island 
 Men's and Women's Doubles - a maximum of 2 pairs per Member Island
 Mixed Doubles - a maximum of 4 competitors per Member Island
 Team per Member Island consisting of: 
 Men	Maximum of 4 and a minimum of 2 competitors 
 Women	Maximum of 4 and a minimum of 1 competitor
 Age - minimum 13

Events
As of 2019.

Top Medalists

Men's singles

Men's doubles

Women's singles

Women's doubles

Mixed doubles

Team Event

References 

 
Sports at the Island Games
Table tennis at multi-sport events